The Museum of Innovation and Science (stylized as miSci, and formerly the Schenectady Museum & Suits-Bueche Planetarium) is a museum and planetarium located in Schenectady, New York. miSci's exhibitions and educational programming focus on Science, Technology, Engineering, Art, and Mathematics (STEAM). , the Museum's President is Gina C. Gould, PhD; Vice President of Collections and Exhibitions is Chris Hunter; and Director of Grants and Special Events is Dan Beck.

Inside of the museum is the Suits-Bueche Planetarium. It contains a GOTO Chronos Star Machine, one of only 16 in the United States, which is capable of displaying 8,500 stars and 24 constellation outlines. The projector can show the sky from any location on Earth 100,000 years in the past or in the future.

Also located at miSci is a Challenger Learning Center (CLC), which opened in 2014.

The archives contain over 1.5 million photographs, making them the seventh largest collection of photographs in the US (not including the federal government). The archives also include 110 radios, 60 televisions, 15,000 patents, 5000 books, and 1000 films. Many of the items relate to the history of Schenectady and General Electric. The archives are open to the public by appointment.

References

https://web.archive.org/web/20070818023353/http://www.schenectadymuseum.org/02_exhibits/02_b.htm

External links
Photographs of the Suits-Bueche Planetarium
Photographs of the Schenectady Museum (outdated)

Buildings and structures in Schenectady, New York
Museums in Schenectady County, New York
Science museums in New York (state)
Planetaria in the United States
Industry museums in New York (state)